Evgenii L'vovich Feinberg (27 June 1912 – 10 December 2005) was a Soviet physicist, well known for his contributions to theoretical physics.

He was a son to a physician, born in Baku, moving to Moscow in 1918 where he
graduated from Moscow State University as a theoretical physicist in 1935.
He worked at Lebedev Physical Institute
in Troitsk, Moscow Oblast since 1938,
from where he published over hundred
works in his field.
Mainly, he studied radio physics (wave propagation),
statistical acoustics, the neutron, cosmic rays and particle physics.
In his early years, he studied the Beta-decay of ionized atoms (1939),
inelastic coherent processes (1941) and inelastic diffraction
processes (1954).

He headed the high-energy particle interaction research groups 1952–78.
Was a guest professor at Nizhny Novgorod State University 1944–46 and a
professor at his former school, Moscow Engineering Physics Institute 1946–54, at what is now the
Moscow Institute of Physics and Technology.

Awards
Member of Russian Academy of Science
Pomeranchuk Prize 2000 for his studies of inelasticity of colliding hadron

Publications
On the propagation of radio waves along an imperfect surface, J. Phys., vol. 9, pp. 317–330, 1944
About the external diffractive production of particles in nuclear collisions (1953).  With Isaak Pomeranchuk
Propagation of radiowaves along the terrestrial surface (1961)
Direct production of photons and dileptons in multiple hadron production (1976)
Hadron clusters and half-dressed particles in quantum field theory (1980)
Art in a science dominated world (Gordon & Breach, 1987)
Physicists. Epoch and Personalities (World Scientific, 2011)

References

Soviet physicists
Corresponding Members of the USSR Academy of Sciences
Full Members of the Russian Academy of Sciences
Moscow State University alumni
Academic staff of the Moscow Institute of Physics and Technology
Scientists from Baku
1912 births
2005 deaths
Theoretical physicists